This is a list of caves of Guatemala and their general location.

 Actún Can Cave in Flores, El Petén
 B'onb'il Pek Cave in Chisec, Alta Verapaz
 Chicoy Cave in Purulhá, Baja Verapaz
 Candelaria Caves in Chisec, Alta Verapaz
 Ixobel Cave in Poptún, El Petén
 Jobitzinaj Cave in Flores, El Petén
 K'an Ba Cave in Lanquín, Alta Verapaz
 Grutas de Lanquín in Lanquín, Alta Verapaz
 Las Minas Cave in Esquipulas, Chiquimula
 Naj Tunich in Poptún, El Petén
 Grutas del Rey San Marcos in San Juan Chamelco, Alta Verapaz
 Cuevas del Silvino in Morales, Izabal
 Grutas de Uaxactún in El Petén

See also 
 List of caves
 Speleology

References 
 

 
Guatemala
Caves